Benoît Christian Angbwa Ossoemeyang (born 1 January 1982) is a Cameroonian professional football coach and a former player. He is the manager of Grande-Synthe. He normally played as a defender in a right back position, but could also play on the right side of midfield.

Club career
Angbwa was born in Garoua, North Region.

In January 2011, Angbwa joined Anzhi Makhachkala on a three-year deal from FC Saturn. Halfway through his contract with Anzhi, Angbwa left and signed a three-year contract with FC Rostov on 19 June 2012. After only eight months Angbwa again moved, this time signing a two-year contract with Krylia Sovetov in February 2013. On 30 August 2013 Angbwa was on the move again, re-signing with Anzhi Makhachkala.

In March 2016, Angbwa joined Grande-Synthe.

International career
Angbwa made his international debut for the Cameroon national team on 9 February 2005, against Senegal in a friendly match played in France. He was a member of the Cameroon team at the 2006 African Nations Cup, which exited in the quarter-finals.

Managerial career
In May 2021, Angbwa was appointed as manager of his former club Grande-Synthe.

Career statistics

Notes

Honours
Nacional
 Uruguayan Primera División: 2002

Cameroon
Africa Cup of Nations runner-up:2008

References

1982 births
Living people
People from Garoua
Cameroonian footballers
Association football fullbacks
Cameroon international footballers
2006 Africa Cup of Nations players
2008 Africa Cup of Nations players
Fovu Baham players
Montpellier HSC players
Club Nacional de Football players
Lille OSC players
PFC Krylia Sovetov Samara players
FC Saturn Ramenskoye players
FC Anzhi Makhachkala players
FC Rostov players
Ligue 1 players
Russian Premier League players
Cameroonian expatriate footballers
Cameroonian expatriate sportspeople in Uruguay
Expatriate footballers in Uruguay
Cameroonian expatriate sportspeople in France
Expatriate footballers in France
Cameroonian expatriate sportspeople in Russia
Expatriate footballers in Russia